Maharagama Urban Council is the local authority for Maharagama and surrounding suburbs in Sri Lanka. The Council is responsible for providing a variety of local public services including public health and sanitation, road maintenance, garbage disposal, libraries, public parks and recreational facilities. The stated goals of the council include providing infrastructure needs, and enhancing regional economic development in a sustainable manner.

History

The Maharagama local body was established in 1963 with an area of only .

On 10 January 2002, the Maharagama Urban Council was gazetted by Alick Aluwihare, as Minister of Local Government. Accordingly, the Urban Council was granted jurisdiction over 41 Grama Niladhari divisions. The tenure of the first council began on 15 April 2002.

Geography

Wards 

For electoral and administrative purposes, the Council is divided into 25 wards.

Grama Niladhari Divisions

The council comprises 41 Grama Niladhari Divisions

Demographics

In 2014, the population was 202,557 and the council collected taxes from 77,740 properties.

Services

Health and Sanitation

The council provides the following Health and Sanitation related services:

 Garbage collection and waste Management
 Issuing/renewal of environmental licenses
 Provision of Gully Bowsers for cleaning wastewater
 Provision of Ayurvedic and Dental care

Revenue

The council provides the following certificates and licenses:

 Non-Acquisition Certificate
 Trade License
 Club License
 Bicycle License
 Entertainment Show License

Other revenue generation activities:

 Collection of council rates
 Tax for industry / businesses
 Leasing out advertising hoardings
 Reservation of community halls and playgrounds
 Allocations of crematorium time slots and cemetery burial lots

The council maintains 9 crematoriums.

Building and Industries

The council is in charge of regulating the built environment under its jurisdiction:

 Approvals for the subdivision of land
 Approval of building plans and boundary/retaining wall designs
 Issuance of Certificates of Conformity
 Receiving complaints regarding approvals and dangerous trees

Libraries

The council maintains 4 public libraries, and provides the following services:

 Running 4 libraries:

 Main Library, Maharagama
 Rukmale Library
 Madiwela Library
 Kottawa Kulasevana Library

 Granting of Library membership
 Mobile Library Services
 Renewal of membership
 Providing space for scholarship and studies.

Other Services

The council also provides the following services:

 Maintenance of community halls and conducting community training programs
 Running 4 preschools:

 Maharagama
 Rukmalgama
 Mirihana
 Delgahawatta

See also

 Maharagama Divisional Secretariat
 Maharagama Polling Division

External links 
 Urban Development Authority - Maharagama Zoning Plan
 Ward Map of Maharagama Urban Council - Colombo District

References

Local authorities in Western Province, Sri Lanka
Urban councils of Sri Lanka